The 14th Gold Cup was a Formula One non-championship race held at Oulton Park on 16 September 1967. The race was run over 45 laps of the circuit, and was won by Australian driver Jack Brabham in a Brabham BT24.

Only two Formula 1 cars were entered. The majority of the field was made up of Formula 2 cars. Jackie Stewart was first placed F2 runner, and second overall, in a Matra-Cosworth.

Results
Note: a dark blue background indicates a Formula One entrant.

References
 Results at Silhouet.com 
 Results at F1 Images.de 

International Gold Cup
International Gold Cup
Gold